Gainsborough United Football Club was an English association football club based in Gainsborough, Lincolnshire. They reached the 3rd round of the FA Vase in 1980.

References

Defunct football clubs in England
Defunct football clubs in Lincolnshire